Burlington Trailways is an inter-city bus company based in West Burlington, Iowa.

History
Burlington Trailways was founded in 1929 as the Burlington Transportation Company, a subsidiary of the Chicago, Burlington and Quincy Railroad. It started as a bus line that ran through Highway 34. In 1934, the service expanded to Denver and Omaha and in 1935 from Chicago to California. In 1936 it was a charter member of the Trailways Transportation System, an association of independent intercity bus operators created to offset the growing strength of Greyhound Lines.

In 1952, Burlington Transportation Company was renamed into Burlington Trailways.

Primary Hubs
Burlington, IA
Davenport, IA
Des Moines, IA
Iowa City, IA
Omaha, NE

Routes
As of September 2022, Burlington Trailways operates the following routes. Intermediate stops are not listed.

See also
Express Arrow
Jefferson Lines
List of intercity bus stops in Iowa

Notes

References

External links 
Burlington Trailways official site

Bus transportation in Colorado
Bus transportation in Illinois
Bus transportation in Indiana
Bus transportation in Iowa
Bus transportation in Missouri
Bus transportation in Nebraska
Bus transportation in South Dakota
Bus transportation in Wyoming
Companies based in Iowa
Transport companies established in 1929
Intercity bus companies of the United States
1929 establishments in Iowa
Transportation companies based in Iowa
Trailways Transportation System